Rudolph Phillips is a former professional Canadian football offensive lineman who played seven seasons in the Canadian Football League, mainly for the Ottawa Rough Riders.  He played college football at North Texas University. He won the CFL's Most Outstanding Offensive Lineman Award in 1982 and 1983. He was inducted into the Canadian Football Hall of Fame in 2009.

External links
Just Sports Stats

1958 births
Living people
American players of Canadian football
Calgary Stampeders players
Canadian Football Hall of Fame inductees
Canadian football offensive linemen
Edmonton Elks players
North Texas Mean Green football players
Ottawa Rough Riders players